John Joseph Gordon (born 25 December 1963) is a songwriter from Queensland, Australia. 
In late 2010, he released the controversial climate change protest song Australia (Whore of the world) – which lambasts Australia's continuing coal exports, and open slather approach to mining in general.
He has released 3 Albums. 'Notre Dame' (2007), 'Alive in Bornheim' (2009) and 'Souvenir' (2010) – the latter 2 were recorded in Frankfurt, Germany – and is perhaps best known for his song 'Inexorably Yours' which was covered by songstress Wendy Matthews on her 1994 Multi-Platinum album 'Lily'.

Discography

*Souvenir (2010) 
1. Let The Sunshine
2. Emily
3. Souvenir
4. Small Town Vignette
5. Gettin' Out Finally
6. MS
7. Sycamore
8. Craver of Security
9. Mystral Wind Over Dubrovnik
10. Valiant Lady
11. Theys Goodbye

*Alive in Bornheim
1. rooftop conversation pt1
2. In a Strange Country
3. Time Will Tell
4. Alive in Bornheim
5. Moonsong
6. White Dove Sail
7. Evidently (Her letter to me)
8. Turn Me Around
9. Kiss of Life
10. Seein' it Through
11. Whatever It Takes
12. Holy War
13. rooftop conversation pt2

*Notre Dame
1. Labour
2. Inexorably Yours
3. Notre Dame
4. Iris May
5. Religion
6. Notre Dame 2
7. baby come back (bonus)

References

External links
 Down To Earth Magazine, India – Website
 Sydney Morning Herald Feature
 The Courier Mail Newspaper Feature
 Music NT Link

1963 births
Living people
Australian singer-songwriters
People from the Darling Downs
Australian male singer-songwriters